The Outlaw Michael Howe  is a 2013 Australian historical drama film written and directed by Brendan Cowell. Set in the early 19th century, the film is based on the exploits of Michael Howe, an Englishman who was transported as a convict to the Australian penal colony of Van Diemen's Land (now Tasmania), where he achieved infamy as a bushranger and outlaw.

Cast
 Damon Herriman - Michael Howe
 Mirrah Foulkes - Maria Lord
 Rarriwuy Hick - Mary
 Matt Day - Robert Knopwood
 Darren Gilshenan - Lieutenant Governor Thomas Davey
 Benedict Hardie - Peter Septon
 Pip Miller - Magistrate Humphrey
 Amanda Bishop - Susan 
 Nicholas Cassim - Lieutenant Governor William Sorell
 Patrick Connolly - Carlisle
 Brendan Cowell - British soldier 
 Steve Morris - Convict
 Blake Lindsell - British soldier
 Dean Gould - British soldier

Filming
The film was shot on location in Tasmania, including Mount Field National Park. A large reconstruction of colonial Hobart was also built at Old Sydney Town in New South Wales.

Music
Roger Mason composed the original score for The Outlaw Michael Howe. The soundtrack includes Sarah Blasko's song "A Truth", written and recorded exclusively for the film and featuring Warren Ellis. The Drones' song "How to See Through Fog" is also used in the film.

Release
The film premiered on the ABC on 1 December 2013, and was released on DVD by Madman Entertainment.

Awards

References

External links
 
 Howe leaves Ned Kelly for dead

2013 television films
2013 films
2013 biographical drama films
2013 Western (genre) films
2010s English-language films
2010s vigilante films
Australian biographical drama films
Australian Broadcasting Corporation original programming
Australian films about revenge
Australian drama television films
Australian vigilante films
Biographical films about bandits
Biographical television films
Bushranger films
Films set in 1815
Films set in Tasmania
Western (genre) television films
2010s Australian films